The women's doubles Tournament at the 2006 Bausch & Lomb Championships took place between 3 April and 9 April on outdoor green clay courts in Amelia Island, Florida, USA. Shinobu Asagoe and Katarina Srebotnik won the title, defeating Liezel Huber and Sania Mirza in the final.

Seeds

Main draw

Qualification draw

External links
 ITF tournament edition details

Doubles
Bausch and Lomb Championships